A list of horror films released in 1975.

References

Sources

 

Lists of horror films by year